Brad Gilbert  was the reigning champion of the singles event at the ABN World Tennis Tournament but did not participate in this edition. Unseeded Omar Camporese won the singles title after a 3–6, 7–6(7–4), 7–6(7–4) win in the final against first-seeded Ivan Lendl.

Seeds

  Ivan Lendl (final)
  Thomas Muster (first round)
  Emilio Sánchez (second round)
  Goran Ivanišević (first round)
  Andrei Chesnokov (second round)
  Jonas Svensson (first round)
  Jakob Hlasek (quarterfinals)
  Karel Nováček (quarterfinals)

Draws

Finals

Upper half

Lower half

References

External links
 ITF tournament edition details

1991 ABN AMRO World Tennis Tournament
1991 ATP Tour